

Companies (2014 onwards)
This is a partial list of companies that are headquartered in the Greater Moncton Area, including Dieppe and Riverview, New Brunswick, Canada:

Arms of J.D. Irving Limited based in Moncton

Former companies

This is a list of notable head offices formerly located in Moncton:
 Canadian National Railway (Atlantic Region)
 CN Marine
 Eaton's catalogue (Atlantic Region)
 Intercolonial Railway of Canada

See also
Chamber of commerce
Acadian French

References

External links
The Greater Moncton Chamber of Commerce official website

Moncton